Rhamnus orbiculata is a species of plant in the buckthorn family. It has simple leaves, and is mostly found in Europe and the Middle East. It was first described by Joseph Friedrich Nicolaus Bornmüller in 1887.

References

Rhamnus (plant)
Taxa named by Joseph Friedrich Nicolaus Bornmüller